The Old Guys is a British situation comedy television series broadcast on BBC One starring Roger Lloyd-Pack, Clive Swift, and Jane Asher.

Twelve 30-minute episodes were broadcast. The first series premiered on 21 January 2009 and ran for six episodes, concluding on 7 March 2009. In May 2009, it was confirmed that The Old Guys would have a second series, that series started on 9 July 2010 once again ran for six episodes, concluding on 13 August 2010. The first episode of series one gained 4.95 million viewers, an audience share of 22.5%, the following episode slumped slightly with 3.75 million (17.2%) viewers.

The first series of The Old Guys was released On DVD on 28 June 2010.

Both series have been repeated on GOLD and PBS.

Series overview

Episode list

Series 1 (2009)

Series 2 (2010)
Katherine Parkinson (Amber) and Justin Edwards (Steve) are absent for four episodes: "Quiz", "Triple Date", "Builders" and "Hospital"

Future
A third series was planned for broadcast in 2011 but the idea was later dropped. The show would now be unable to return due to the deaths of both Roger Lloyd-Pack and Clive Swift.

Other Information
Both series of The Old Guys are available to buy on iTunes.
Series 1 has been released on DVD but, for unknown reasons, series 2 is not available in this format.

References

Lists of British sitcom episodes